The Bridge Mill Power Plant is an historic hydroelectric plant at 25 Roosevelt Avenue in Pawtucket, Rhode Island.  It is a red brick building, with sections two and three stories in height, located on the west bank of the Seekonk River.  An ashlar granite retaining wall obscures a conduit which delivers water to the facility from the Pawtucket Falls Dam.  The facility has three parts: a gate house, which controls the flow of water into the power house, where five turbines were located.  A boiler house housed a steam generation facility which was used to generate power when the water levels were too low for hydroelectric power generation.  Built in 1893, this is probably the best-preserved 19th-century hydroelectric power station in Rhode Island.

The plant was listed on the National Register of Historic Places in 1983.

See also

National Register of Historic Places listings in Pawtucket, Rhode Island

References

Industrial buildings and structures on the National Register of Historic Places in Rhode Island
Energy infrastructure on the National Register of Historic Places
Hydroelectric power plants in Rhode Island
Energy infrastructure completed in 1893
Buildings and structures in Pawtucket, Rhode Island
National Register of Historic Places in Pawtucket, Rhode Island